Falcuna lacteata is a butterfly in the family Lycaenidae. It is found in Angola. The habitat consists of primary forests.

References

Endemic fauna of Angola
Butterflies described in 1963
Poritiinae